The 1972 United States Senate election in Virginia was held on November 7, 1972. Republican U.S. Representative William L. Scott defeated incumbent Democratic Senator William Spong Jr. Scott was the first Republican U.S. Senator from Virginia to be elected in over a century, as the most recent Republican Senator was John F. Lewis, who had held the seat during the Reconstruction era. This is the last time a candidate not named Warner won this seat.

Candidates

Democratic
William B. Spong, Jr., incumbent U.S. senator

Republican
William Lloyd Scott, U.S. Representative from Virginia's 8th congressional district

Results

References

See also
 1972 United States Senate elections

Virginia
1972
1972 Virginia elections